The 1931 Paris–Tours was the 26th edition of the Paris–Tours cycle race and was held on 3 May 1931. The race started in Paris and finished in Tours. The race was won by André Leducq.

General classification

References

1931 in French sport
1931
May 1931 sports events